Govilon is a small Welsh village located between Llanfoist and Gilwern near Abergavenny in north Monmouthshire. It is part of the community of Llanfoist Fawr. the population was 1,447 in 2011.

Attractions 

The Monmouthshire and Brecon Canal passes through the village. The village has views overlooking the valley of the River Usk and up to the heights of the southern flank of the Black Mountains, Wales. Llanwenarth House, nearby, was built in the 16th century and is operated as a hotel.

Governance
The Llanwenarth Ultra ward (covering Govilon) elects a county councillor to Monmouthshire County Council. Llanwenarth Ultra is also a community ward, electing or co-opting up to six of the twelve community councillors to Llanfoist Fawr Community Council.

References

External links
 The History of Govilon
 Govilon in the Brecon Beacons National Park
 www.geograph.co.uk : photos of Govilon and surrounding area

Villages in Monmouthshire
Brecon Beacons